The St. Michael's Creole Benevolent Association Hall (also known as the St. Michael's Benevolent Social Club Hall) is a historic site in Pensacola, Florida. It is located at 416 East Government Street. On May 3, 1974, it was added to the U.S. National Register of Historic Places.

References

External links
Florida's Office of Cultural and Historical Programs
Escambia County listings
St. Michael's Creole Benevolent Association Meeting Hall

Gallery

Buildings and structures in Pensacola, Florida
National Register of Historic Places in Escambia County, Florida
Vernacular architecture in Florida
Historic American Buildings Survey in Florida